Joakim Nilsson may refer to:

Joakim Nilsson (footballer, born 1966), Swedish footballer
Joakim Nilsson (footballer, born 1985), Swedish footballer
Joakim Nilsson (footballer, born 1994), Swedish footballer
Joakim Nilsson (javelin), Swedish javelin thrower